Lara Jo Regan is an American photographer. Her work has spanned the realms of photojournalism, documentary, street, fine art, magazine photography and film. She contributed frequently to national publications including Time, Newsweek, LIFE, the Los Angeles Times Magazine, the Los Angeles Magazine, Premiere, and Entertainment Weekly from the late 1980s to the mid Aughts. She later worked on long-term documentary and fine art projects while becoming a photography columnist for Artillery magazine in 2011 and continued to author books on dog photography. 

The recipient of many of her field’s top honors, the progressive hybrid nature of her work influenced the aesthetic direction of photojournalism documentary coverage of the entertainment industry and animal portraiture.

Regan won the World Press Photo of the Year in 2000 and was the creator of the Mr. Winkle photo collection that achieved international cult popularity. Residing in Los Angeles since 1985, she has also built up one of the most extensive collections of Southern California street photography.

References

American photojournalists
Living people
Year of birth missing (living people)
American women photographers
21st-century American women
Women photojournalists